Walter Leslie Perry (21 May 1922 – 20 March 2000) was an Australian rules footballer who played with North Melbourne in the Victorian Football League (VFL).

Perry served in the Australian Army and the Royal Australian Air Force during World War II.

Notes

External links 

1922 births
2000 deaths
Australian rules footballers from Victoria (Australia)
North Melbourne Football Club players